Solís de Mataojo is a small town in the southwest edge of the Lavalleja Department of southern Uruguay.

Geography
The town is located on Km. 83 of Route 8. The stream Arroyo Solís Grande flows along the southeast limits of the town.

History
It was created as a "Pueblo" (village) by Decree of 12 August 1874. Its status was elevated to "Villa" (town) category on 15 October 1963 by decree Ley N° 13.167.

Population
In 2011, Solís de Mataojo had a population of 2,825.
 
Source: Instituto Nacional de Estadística de Uruguay

Places of worship
 Our Lady of Mt. Carmel Parish Church (Roman Catholic)

Notable people
 Eduardo Fabini, composer and musician
 Manuel Espínola Gómez, painter
 Juan Capagorry, illustrator and writer

References

External links
INE map of Solís de Mataojo

Populated places in the Lavalleja Department